Metromedia (also often MetroMedia) was an American media company that owned radio and television stations in the United States from 1956 to 1986 and controlled Orion Pictures from 1988 to 1997. Metromedia was established in 1956 after the DuMont Television Network ceased operations and its owned-and-operated stations were spun off into a separate company. Metromedia sold its television stations to News Corporation in 1985 (which News Corp. then used to form the nucleus of Fox Television Stations), and spun off its radio stations into a separate company in 1986. Metromedia then acquired ownership stakes in various film studios, including controlling ownership in Orion. In 1997, Metromedia closed down and sold its media assets to Metro-Goldwyn-Mayer.

History

Origins
The company arose from the ashes of the DuMont Television Network, the world's first commercial television network. DuMont had been in economic trouble throughout its existence, and was seriously undermined when ABC accepted a buyout offer from United Paramount Theaters in 1953. The ABC-UPT deal gave ABC the resources to operate a national television service along the lines of CBS and NBC. DuMont officials quickly realized the ABC-UPT deal put their network on life support, and agreed in principle to merge with ABC. However, it was forced to back out of the deal when minority owner Paramount Pictures raised antitrust concerns. UPT had only spun off from Paramount four years earlier, and there were still doubts about whether the two companies were really separate.

By 1955, DuMont realized it could not compete against the other three networks and decided to wind down its operations. Soon after DuMont formally shut down network service in 1956, the parent firm DuMont Laboratories spun off the network's two remaining owned and operated stations, WABD in New York City and WTTG in Washington, D.C., to shareholders as the DuMont Broadcasting Corporation. The company's headquarters were co-located with WABD in the former DuMont Tele-Centre (which was later renamed the Metromedia Telecenter) in New York.

In 1957, DuMont Broadcasting purchased two New York area radio stations, WNEW (now WBBR) and WHFI (later WNEW-FM and WWFS), and later that year changed its name to the Metropolitan Broadcasting Corporation to distance itself from its former parent company. The following year, Paramount sold its shares in Metropolitan Broadcasting to Washington-based investor John Kluge, enough to give Kluge controlling interest. Kluge installed himself as chairman, and later increased his holdings to 75 percent. WABD's call letters were later changed to WNEW-TV to match its new radio sisters.

Expansion

Metropolitan Broadcasting's first acquisitions included WHK-AM-FM in Cleveland (in 1958); the Foster & Kleiser outdoor advertising firm (in 1959); and KOVR in Stockton, California, Benedict Gimbel Jr.-owned WIP-AM-FM in Philadelphia, WTVH-TV (now WHOI) in Peoria, Illinois, and WTVP television (now WAND) in Decatur, Illinois (all in 1960). In 1961 Metropolitan purchased KMBC-AM-TV in Kansas City, Missouri. Later that year the company's name was changed to Metromedia; the Metropolitan Broadcasting name was retained for its broadcasting division until 1967.

In separate 1963 deals the company expanded into Los Angeles, buying first KTTV and later KLAC and the original KLAC-FM (now KIIS-FM). The company would later engineer a swap of FM facilities; the second KLAC-FM (later KMET and now KTWV) was established in 1965. Metromedia also entered the realm of live entertainment by purchasing the Ice Capades (in 1963) and the Harlem Globetrotters (in 1967). Later in the decade Metromedia opened a television production center in Los Angeles, known as Metromedia Square, which served as the studio facility for numerous network programs. Metromedia also owned a TV production and distribution company called Metromedia Producers Corporation (MPC), established in 1968 from Wolper Productions. MPC produced and syndicated various programs and TV movies, most notably the game show Truth or Consequences and the 1972-86 version of The Merv Griffin Show. Metromedia spent the 1970s and the first half of the 1980s increasing its television and radio station portfolio, and continued to expand its syndication business. In 1976, it teamed up with MTM Enterprises to launch a first-run syndicated variety show.

Metromedia entered the record business in 1969 with the launch of the Metromedia Records label, whose biggest-selling artist was Bobby Sherman. The label was also notable as having issued the first two studio albums of Peter Allen, Peter Allen (1971) and Tenterfield Saddler (1972). The label was closed in 1974. Allen's Tenterfield Saddler, the title song of which has become an Australian standard, was acquired and reissued by A&M Records in 1978.

In 1976, similar to the more successful SFM Holiday Network of syndicated stations launched two years later, Metromedia teamed up with Ogilvy and Mather for a proposed linking of independent TV stations termed MetroNet. The proposed programming would consist of several Sunday night family dramas, on weeknights a half-hour serial and a gothic series similar to Dark Shadows, and on Saturdays a variety program hosted by Charo. The plans for MetroNet failed when advertisers balked at Metromedia's advertising rate, which was only slightly lower than the Big Three's and low national coverage, leaving for another similar operation, Operation Prime Time. In 1979, Metromedia Producers Corporation had also reached a deal with Bob Stewart Productions for an exclusive co-producing agreement.

In 1982, Metromedia made its biggest broadcasting purchase when it acquired WCVB-TV in Boston for $220 million, which at the time was the largest amount ever spent on a single television station property. Two years later, John Kluge bought out Metromedia's shareholders and took the company private.

Also around this time, Metromedia attempted to bring to the air a national newscast for independent stations (much as the rival Tribune Company had created Independent Network News in 1980), planned for launch in the fall of 1983; the company attempted to hire Charles Kuralt away from CBS News to serve as anchor. Kuralt chose to stay to with CBS; John Hart was also considered as an anchor, but ultimately the planned newscast never came to fruition.

1985-86 divestitures
On May 4, 1985, Kluge announced the sale of Metromedia's television stations, and Metromedia Producers Corp., to News Corporation (owned by Australian newspaper publisher Rupert Murdoch) and 20th Century Fox Film Corporation (owned jointly by Murdoch and Marvin Davis) for $3.5 billion. With the exception of WCVB-TV (which was subsequently sold to the Hearst Corporation), all of the former Metromedia stations formed the nucleus of the Fox Broadcasting Company (which began operations on October 9, 1986), while MPC was folded into 20th Century Fox Television. The transactions became official on March 6, 1986. Because of these transactions, and the fact that Metromedia was originally spun off from the DuMont Television Network, radio personality Clarke Ingram has suggested that the Fox network is a revival or at least a linear descendant of DuMont.

Kluge also sold Metromedia's outdoor advertising firm, the Harlem Globetrotters, and the Ice Capades in 1985, its cellular phone and yellow pages divisions to the Southwestern Bell Corporation (now known as the second incarnation of AT&T,  due to SBC's acquisition of AT&T Corporation in 2005) and spun off the radio stations into a separate company (which took on the Metropolitan Broadcasting name)

Legal battles
In retaliation for a lawsuit brought by Paul Winchell, who sought the rights to his children's television program Winchell-Mahoney Time, which was produced at KTTV in Los Angeles during the mid-1960s, it is believed that KTTV management destroyed the program's video tapes. In 1989 Winchell was awarded nearly $18 million as compensation for Metromedia's capricious behavior.

In 1983, Christine Craft, a former evening news co-anchor at KMBC-TV in Kansas City, sued Metromedia on claims of fraud and sexual discrimination. After spending eight months at KMBC-TV in 1981, she was demoted to reporting assignment after a focus group study claimed Craft was "too old, too unattractive and not deferential to men" in the eyes of viewers. Craft declined the reassignment and subsequently resigned from the station. Craft initially won her case, though she lost on appeal at the U.S. Supreme Court.

Ownership of film studios
On May 22, 1986, Metromedia acquired a 6.5% stake in Orion Pictures Corporation; a movie and television studio. By December, the stake in Orion's ownership was increased to 9.3% to 12.6% and on April 12, 1988, to 44.1% On May 20, 1988, Metromedia acquired Sumner Redstone's share for $78 million, holding a majority stake in Orion Pictures worth nearly 67%. In 1995, Kluge merged Orion, MCEG Sterling Entertainment (producer of the Look Who's Talking series), the holding company Actava, and Metromedia into a new Metromedia International Group. In November 1995, Metromedia announced that it would acquire Motion Picture Corporation of America (MPCA) for $32 million, followed by The Samuel Goldwyn Company for $115 million in February 1996. On April 11, 1997, Metromedia sold Orion/Goldwyn and MPCA to Metro-Goldwyn-Mayer (MGM) for $573 million and was closed on July 10 of the same year. In 1998, MPCA broke apart from MGM becoming independent again.

Activities following film sale
Following the sale of the film business to MGM, Metromedia still owned Metromedia Restaurant Group (which it had renamed from S&A Restaurant Group, which was acquired from Grand Metropolitan) in 1990 as well as Metromedia Fiber Network. The latter went bankrupt a few years later and became AboveNet, while the former went bankrupt in 2008.

Typeface
Beginning in 1967, Metromedia's television stations began utilizing a sans-serif typeface for their on-air logo. The typeface was a proprietary one called Metromedia Television Alphabet, which was as distinctive as the typeface employed by Group W unit of Westinghouse Electric for its TV and radio stations beginning in 1963. Metromedia Television Alphabet was used for the channel numbers of its television stations until 1977, when another typeface modeled slightly after the Futura family was introduced.

Former Metromedia stations
Stations are listed alphabetically by state and city of license.

Two boldface asterisks appearing following a station's call letters (**) indicate a station that was built and signed-on by Metromedia or its predecessor companies. This list does not include WDTV (now KDKA-TV) in Pittsburgh or KCTY in Kansas City. Although DuMont owned the two stations at some point, Metromedia never owned either of these two stations.

Television stations

Radio stations

Notes 
1 The acquisition of KMBC-AM-TV also included KMOS-TV in Sedalia, Missouri, and KFRM radio in Concordia, Kansas. Both stations were subsequently spun off by Metropolitan Broadcasting to other firms;
2 DuMont Broadcasting also acquired a construction permit for channel 19 in Cleveland along with its purchase of WHK radio in 1958 but that station, intended to be called WHK-TV, never signed on. The channel 19 allocation was later occupied by WOIO, which signed-on in 1985 under common ownership with WHK (Malrite Broadcasting);
3 The acquisition of KRLD also included the Texas State Network.

Television syndication
This is a list of television programs that were produced and/or syndicated by Metromedia Producers Corporation (MPC):

 Allen Ludden's Gallery (1969)
 The Ann Sothern Show (1958–1961)
 B.A.D. Cats
 Charlie's Angels
 Chopper One
 The Cross-Wits (1975–1980) (co-produced with Ralph Edwards Productions)
 Crusader Rabbit (1950–1952, 1956–1959)
 Dusty's Trail (1973–1974) (co-produced with Redwood Productions and Writer First Productions)
 Dynasty (distributor, 1985–1986)
 Expedition Danger
 Family
 Firehouse (1974) (co-produced with Stonehenge Productions)
 Groovie Goolies and Friends
 The Great Space Coaster (co-produced with Sunbow Productions) 
 Hart to Hart
 Here We Go Again (1973)
 Hit Man (co-produced with Jay Wolpert Productions)
 Jane Goodall and the World of Animal Behavior
 Jeopardy! (original version - distributor, 1974)
 Kids Are People Too (1978–1982)
 Little Gloria... Happy at Last (1982; mini-series)
 Mayberry RFD (distributor)
 The Merv Griffin Show (distributor/co-producer, 1972–1983)
 Movin' On (distributor)
 My Favorite Martian (distributor)
 National Geographic Specials (1964–1971)
 The New Avengers (U.S. distributor)
 The New Howdy Doody Show (1976–1977)
 Primus (1971–1972) (co-produced with Ivan Tors Films)
 Queen for a Day (1969–1970)
 S.W.A.T.
 Small Wonder (production company, 1985–1986)
 Soul Train (syndicated by Tribune Entertainment then Trifecta Entertainment & Media; rights now owned by ViacomCBS Domestic Media Networks)
 Star Search (production company, 1983–1986)
 Starsky & Hutch
 Strange Paradise
 Strike Force
 The Super (1972)
 Super Pay Cards (1981–1982; distributor)
 Susie (1953–1957)
 T.J. Hooker
 That Girl (distributor)
 Thicke of the Night (distributor)
 Too Close for Comfort (1980–1987) (co-produced with D.L. Taffner Productions)
 Truth or Consequences (distributor, 1966–1978) (co-produced with Ralph Edwards Productions)
 The Undersea World of Jacques Cousteau
 Untamed World (co-produced with the CTV Television Network)
 Vauldeville
 Vega$ (1978–1981) (distributor)
 Wild Times (1980; mini-series)
 Winchell-Mahoney Time (1965–1968)
 Wonderama (1955–1977, 1980–1983)

Notes

References
https://github.com/microsoft/WindowsAppSDK/issues/3089#issue-1430110636

External links
 
New York Times 1986 announcement of Metromedia liquidation
Metromedia Radio, a Web based radio station holds the WNEW tape archive and trademark rights to the Metromedia name and Soundmark rights to the WNEW and Metromedia Radio jingles

 
Defunct broadcasting companies of the United States
Defunct television broadcasting companies of the United States
Defunct radio broadcasting companies of the United States
Fox Broadcasting Company
Publishing companies established in 1956
DuMont Television Network
Defunct radio networks in the United States
Fox Television Stations
The Walt Disney Company subsidiaries
1956 establishments in New York City
1997 disestablishments in New York (state)
Mass media companies disestablished in 1997
Publishing companies disestablished in 1997
Mass media companies established in 1956